Vitomir Jelić (Serbian Cyrillic: Витомир Јелић; born January 21, 1982) is a Serbian former professional footballer who played as a defender.

Playing career 
Jelić began his career in 2001 in the Second League of FR Yugoslavia with FK Polet Ljubić. After several years in the second league he achieved promotion to the First League of FR Yugoslavia in 2003 with Borac Cacak. He would later have stints with FK Remont Čačak, and Mladost Lucani, before returning to Borac in 2005. In 2005, he went across the border to Bosnia to play with NK Žepče in the Premier League of Bosnia and Herzegovina. He later played in the Czech National Football League with MFK Karviná in 2008.

In early 2009, he played with FK Radnički 1923. For the remainder of the 2009 season he played in the Myanmar National League with Zeyar Shwe Myay F.C. In 2012, he went overseas to Canada to sign with the Serbian White Eagles in the Canadian Soccer League. Throughout his tenure with Toronto he assisted in securing the CSL Championship in 2016 after defeating Hamilton City SC.

Honors 
Serbian White Eagles
 CSL Championship: 2016

References

1982 births
Living people
Sportspeople from Čačak
Serbian footballers
FK Borac Čačak players
Serbian White Eagles FC players
Canadian Soccer League (1998–present) players
FK Polet Ljubić players
FK Remont Čačak players
FK Mladost Lučani players
NK Žepče players
MFK Karviná players
First League of Serbia and Montenegro players
Premier League of Bosnia and Herzegovina players
Czech National Football League players
Association football defenders
Myanmar National League players